Alan Barrionuevo (born 2 January 1997) is an Argentine professional footballer who plays as a centre-back for Central Córdoba SdE, on loan from Almirante Brown.

Career
Barrionuevo started his career with Almirante Brown. He made his professional debut in Primera B Metropolitana on 6 May 2017, as Alberto Pascutti selected him off the bench in place of Josimar Mosquera during a 1–0 win over Tristán Suárez. In the following campaign, 2017–18, Barrionuevo made the first three starts of his career in fixtures against San Miguel, Estudiantes and Barracas Central.

On 1 June 2022 it was confirmed, that Barrionuevo would join Argentine Primera División club Central Córdoba SdE on a loan deal until the end June 2023 with a purchase option.

Career statistics
.

References

External links

1997 births
Living people
Place of birth missing (living people)
Argentine footballers
Association football defenders
Primera B Metropolitana players
Club Almirante Brown footballers
Central Córdoba de Santiago del Estero footballers